Myrza-Patcha is a small village located in Batken Region, Kyrgyzstan. The village is subordinated to the town of Isfana within the Leylek District. Its population was 901 in 2021.

References

External links 

 Official website of the town of Isfana 

Villages that are part of Isfana
Populated places in Batken Region